Centaurea seridis is a species of Centaurea found in the Eastern Mediterranean.

References

External links

seridis